Elusa confusa is a species of moth of the family Noctuidae. It was described by Warren in 1913, and is known from New Guinea.

References

Moths described in 1913
Hadeninae
Moths of New Guinea